Washington Township is a township in Wayne County, Iowa, USA.

History
Washington Township is named for George Washington.

References

Townships in Wayne County, Iowa
Townships in Iowa